HMS Rippon was a 60-gun fourth rate ship of the line of the Royal Navy, built by Joseph Allin the elder at Deptford Dockyard and launched on 23 August 1712.

Orders were issued on 23 June 1730 directing that Rippon be taken to pieces and rebuilt at Woolwich. Unlike almost every other ship of the line rebuild of the time, Rippon was not reconstructed to the dimensions laid out in the naval establishments, though the differences were not pronounced. As an experiment into increasing the sizes of the Royal Navy's ships in response to the growth of foreign vessels Rippon had one foot added to the gundeck and keel lengths, and the breadth. In addition , a new-built ship, had previously been built with one foot great breadth over the standard dimensions of the 1719 Establishment. She was relaunched on 29 March 1735.

Rippon served until 1751, when she was broken up.

Notes

References

 Lavery, Brian (2003) The Ship of the Line - Volume 1: The development of the battlefleet 1650-1850. Conway Maritime Press. .

External links
 

Ships of the line of the Royal Navy
1710s ships